Bruce Man-Son-Hing (born April 13, 1964) is a former professional tennis player from the United States.

Early life and college
Man-Son-Hing, who is of Chinese descent, was born in Grenada on April 13, 1964. His family emigrated to Los Angeles when he was nine years old. He attended Glendale High School and went to college at UC Irvine.

Professional career
After four years at UC Irvine, Man-Son-Hing joined the professional circuit.

He competed in the men's doubles at all four Grand Slam events in 1989, partnering with John Letts. They made the second round of the Australian Open and Wimbledon Championships. He also appeared in the mixed doubles draw at the French Open (with Camille Benjamin) and Wimbledon (with Cynthia MacGregor) but was unable to progress past the first round at either.

Man-Son-Hing and Letts were doubles runners-up at two Grand Prix tournaments in 1989, the Benson and Hedges Open and Seoul Open.

Personal
Man-Son-Hing has two children, both whom play tennis. His daughter, Sabrina, played for Cal State Northridge and his son, Bruce Jr. played for UC Irvine.

Grand Prix career finals

Doubles: 2 (0–2)

Challenger titles

Doubles: (3)

References

1964 births
Living people
American male tennis players
Grenadian male tennis players
Tennis people from California
Grenadian emigrants to the United States
Grenadian people of Chinese descent
American sportspeople of Chinese descent
UC Irvine Anteaters men's tennis players